An election to the city duma (municipal assembly) of Ekaterinburg was held on November 5, 1917. The election was part of the series of municipal elections across Russia following the February Revolution. A Ekaterinburg city duma election had been held on July 30, 1917, but in November a second election was held.

The Bolsheviks emerged as the largest party in the new city duma, with 40 out of 85 seats. The share of Bolshevik votes had increased from 21% in the July election to 46%. On November 14, the new city duma elected veteran Bolshevik leader  as the new mayor. Voikov was elected city duma chairman. Chutskaev and others among the newly elected Bolsheviks requested the assistance of the outgoing administration to help with the transition.

The Socialist-Revolutionaries formed the second largest contingent in the new city duma, with 20 deputies. As part of their election campaign, the SRs held a concert at the Verkh-Iset Theater in early November. The election result illustrated the declining influence of the SRs in the city.

The result was humiliating for the Mensheviks, after the election the membership of the Menshevik party decreased rapidly in the city.

Result
Below an account from Kononenko (2003), with a total of 81 seats. However, other references outline that the city duma had 85 seats - among them 40 held by Bolsheviks, 20 SRs and 15 Kadets.

References

Yekaterinburg
Local elections in Russia
Russian Revolution